The 1947 Grand National was the 101st renewal of the renewal of the Grand National horse race that took place at Aintree Racecourse near Liverpool, England, on 29 March 1947.

The race was won by 100/1 Irish outsider Caughoo. The eight-year-old was ridden by 35-year-old jockey Eddie Dempsey and trained by Herbert McDowell, for owner John McDowell who had bought Caughoo for £50. The Irish Lough Conn finished in second place, Kami, from France, was third, and Prince Regent, also from Ireland, fourth.

Fifty-seven horses ran — the largest field since 1929 when 66 participated — and all returned safely to the stables.

Finishing order

Non-finishers

References

 1947
Grand National
Grand National
20th century in Lancashire